Gomathi Srinivasan is an Indian politician and was Minister of Social Welfare in the Government of Tamil Nadu between 1980 and 1987, as well as a Member of the Legislative Assembly (MLA) in the Tamil Nadu Legislative Assembly.

Srinivasan was elected to the Tamil Nadu legislative assembly as an All India Anna Dravida Munnetra Kazhagam (AIADMK) candidate from Valangiman constituency in 1980. She served as Minister of Social Welfare in the cabinet of M. G. Ramachandran between 1980 and 1987, being re-elected from the same constituency, which was reserved for candidates from the Scheduled Castes, in the 1984 election.

After Ramachandran had died, Srinivasan switched allegiances and joined the Dravida Munnetra Kazhagam (DMK), for whom she won the Valangiman seat in the 1996 elections. The DMK denied her the opportunity to contest the 2001 elections and later suspended her for alleged anti-party activities. She returned to the AIADMK in September 2013.

Srinivasan was among several former DMK ministers legislators charged by Tamil Nadu Police in June 2005 of having assets disproportionate to their known income. All charges were dismissed by the courts in 2015 due to lack of evidence.

References 

All India Anna Dravida Munnetra Kazhagam politicians
Dravida Munnetra Kazhagam politicians
Living people
20th-century Indian women politicians
20th-century Indian politicians
Tamil Nadu MLAs 1985–1989
Tamil Nadu MLAs 1996–2001
Year of birth missing (living people)
Women members of the Tamil Nadu Legislative Assembly